The Mbalam mine is a large iron mine located in south-east Cameroon in the East Region. Mbalam represents one of the largest iron ore reserves in Cameroon and in the world having estimated reserves of 800 million tonnes of ore grading 62% iron metal.

See also 

 List of mines in Cameroon
 List of iron mines

References 

Iron mines in Cameroon